The 2022 South American Aerobic Gymnastics Championships were held in Lima, Peru, from August 24 to 28, 2022. The competition was organized by the Peruvian Gymnastics Federation and approved by the International Gymnastics Federation.

Medalists

References

2022 in gymnastics
International gymnastics competitions hosted by Peru
2022 in Peruvian sport
South American Gymnastics Championships
South American Aerobic Gymnastics Championships